Otis "Candy" Finch, Jr. was an American jazz drummer. 

He played and recorded with Stanley Turrentine, Shirley Scott, Milt Jackson, and Dizzy Gillespie (1966-9). 

Finch also recorded with Gene Ammons, Billy Mitchell, and Al Grey.

Discography

This Is Billy Mitchell (1962) - Billy Mitchell, Smash Records.

Night Song (1963) - Al Grey with Billy Mitchell, Argo Records.

 Having a Ball (1963) - Al Grey, Argo Records.

 Blue Flames (1964) - Shirley Scott and Stanley Turrentine,  Prestige Records.

 In Memory Of (1964) - Stanley Turrentine, recorded in 1964 but not released until the 1980s,  Blue Note.

 Hustlin' (1965) - Stanley Turrentine with Shirley Scott, Kenny Burrell, Bob Cranshaw, and Otis Finch, Blue Note.

 Milt Jackson at the Museum of Modern Art (1965) - Milt Jackson, Limelight Records.

 Born Free (1966) - Milt Jackson, Limelight Records.

References
Footnotes

1933 births
1982 deaths
American jazz drummers
20th-century American drummers
American male drummers
20th-century American male musicians
American male jazz musicians